Elizabeth Porter Todd Edwards (13 November 1813 – 22 February 1888) was the sister of Mary Todd Lincoln.  She served as Mary's guardian for many years.  Mary met Abraham Lincoln in 1839 at Elizabeth Edwards' home, where they later married.  In 1875 Elizabeth helped Mary get released from an insane asylum.

Biography
Elizabeth Edwards was born in Lexington, Kentucky in 1813 to Robert Todd and Elizabeth Parker Todd.  She married Ninian Wirt Edwards, the son of a former Illinois governor, in 1832.  The Edwards lived in a well-to-do house on Aristocracy Hill in Springfield, Illinois.  They would host many gatherings of the Springfield gentry, and Elizabeth invited her three sisters, including Mary, to live with her.  Mary met Abraham Lincoln in one of the Edwards social gatherings and they married there on November 4, 1842.  Elizabeth lived in the White House with her sister Mary for the inauguration.  She returned in 1862 to console Mary after the death of her son Willie.

Mary Lincoln is believed to have suffered severe depression during her First Ladyship and after Abraham's death.  Her son, Robert Todd Lincoln, committed her to an insane asylum in 1875, over Elizabeth's objections.  Mary was released from asylum into Elizabeth's care after a trial.  Mary died at Elizabeth's home in 1882.  Elizabeth died in 1888 and is buried in Oak Ridge Cemetery in Springfield.

References 

1813 births
1888 deaths
19th-century American women
Burials at Oak Ridge Cemetery
People from Lexington, Kentucky
People from Springfield, Illinois
Spouses of Illinois politicians